Zeroone is an album by Mia Doi Todd, released in 2001 by City Zen Records.

Track listing
 Digital
 Poppy Fields
 Obsession
 Ziggurat
 Bound Feet & Feathered
 Merry Me
 Can I?
 Amnesia
 Like A Knife
 Tugboat

References 

2001 albums
Mia Doi Todd albums